Silvain may refer to:

Silvain (opera), an opera by André Ernest Modeste Grétry
Silvain of Ahun, French martyr and saint
15899 Silvain, an asteroid

People with the surname
Eugène Silvain (1851–1930), French actor
Pierre Silvain (1926–2009), French writer and playwright

Ships
, a Dutch fishing trawler in service 1904–16

See also
Saint-Silvain-Montaigut 
Saint-Silvain-Bellegarde 
Saint-Silvain-sous-Toulx 
Saint-Silvain-Bas-le-Roc
Sylvain (disambiguation)

French-language surnames